The Struggle Continues is an album by American jazz saxophonist Dewey Redman featuring performances recorded in 1982 for the ECM label.

Reception
The Allmusic review by Thom Jurek awarded the album 4½ stars stating "This is one of Dewey Redman's strongest but least celebrated dates... Inspired and inspiring, The Struggle Continues is one of the gems of the ECM catalog in the '80s and a shining star in jazz, period".

Track listing
All compositions by Dewey Redman except as indicated
 "Thren" - 7:53 
 "Love Is" - 10:27 
 "Turn Over Baby" - 4:34 
 "Joie de Vivre" - 8:29 
 "Combinations" - 5:23 
 "Dewey Square" (Charlie Parker) - 8:01 
Recorded in January 1982

Personnel
Dewey Redman - tenor saxophone
Charles Eubanks - piano
Mark Helias - bass
Ed Blackwell - drums

References

ECM Records albums
Dewey Redman albums
1982 albums